Pituitary adenylate cyclase-activating polypeptide type I receptor also known as PAC1, is a protein that in humans is encoded by the ADCYAP1R1 gene.  This receptor binds pituitary adenylate cyclase activating peptide.

Function 

PAC1 is a membrane-associated protein and shares significant homology with members of the G-protein coupled class B glucagon/secretin receptor family. This receptor mediates diverse biological actions of adenylate cyclase activating polypeptide 1 and is positively coupled to adenylate cyclase. Alternative splicing of two exons of this gene generates four major splice variants, but their full-length nature has not been determined. PAC1 is expressed in the adrenal medulla, pancreatic acini, uterus, myenteric plexus and brain. It is also expressed in the trigeminal, otic and superior cervical ganglia (prejunctional) and cerebral arteries (postjunctional).

References

Further reading

External links